The Tomb of Bibi Dokhtaran is built by the Ilkhanate and this building is located in Shiraz.

Sources 

Mausoleums in Iran
National works of Iran